The Myanmar Dental Association (MDA) is a professional association established in 1979 which has more than 4,000 members. The association publishes Myanmar Dental Journal every year. It also arranges Myanmar Dental Conference in which FDI World Dental Federation speakers also make their presentations. Myanmar Dental Association and Myanmar Dental Council are the only two professional organizations for Myanmar Dentists.

Leadership
Past presidents of the organisation include:
 Aung Than (1979–1984)
 Khin Mg Lay (1985–1995)
 Myint Naing (1996–1998)
 Ba Myint (1998–2008)
 Thein Tut (2009–2011)
 Pwint Hpoo (2012–2015)
 Thein Kyu (2016–2019)
 Myint Htain (2020-present)

See also
 Dentistry
 University of Dental Medicine, Mandalay
 University of Dental Medicine, Yangon
 Myanmar Dental Council
 Myanmar Dental Association (Yangon Region)

References

Medical and health organisations based in Myanmar